Business and Professional Women may refer to:
Business and Professional Women's Foundation
International Federation of Business and Professional Women
Women in business